Jonathan Walders (1881 – 13 January 1924) was an English professional footballer who played in the Football League for Burnley as an outside right.

Career 
Walders began his career in non-League football with Barrow before being signed by Second Division club Burnley in 1903. He made 48 league appearances for Burnley and scored two goals, before leaving to join Oldham Athletic in 1906. He left Boundary Park after one season and had further spells in non-League football with Luton Town and Chorley.

Personal life 
Walders' brother David also became a footballer. Walders enlisted in the Loyal North Lancashire Regiment in 1899 and was stationed in Malta, Crete and Gibraltar, before returning to Britain for home service in February 1903. After Britain's entry into the First World War, he rejoined the regiment and was posted to the Western Front in August 1914. Walders was taken prisoner of war by Germany on 22 December 1914 and remained in captivity until 6 September 1918, two months before the armistice. He was discharged from the army in February 1919.

References

1881 births
1924 deaths
Footballers from Barrow-in-Furness
English footballers
Barrow A.F.C. players
Burnley F.C. players
Oldham Athletic A.F.C. players
Luton Town F.C. players
Chorley F.C. players
English Football League players
Association football outside forwards
British Army personnel of World War I
Loyal Regiment soldiers
British World War I prisoners of war
World War I prisoners of war held by Germany
Footballers from Cumbria
Military personnel from Lancashire